Milesia zamiel is a species of hoverfly in the family Syrphidae.

Distribution
Borneo.

References

Insects described in 1856
Eristalinae
Diptera of Asia
Taxa named by Francis Walker (entomologist)